Istállós-kő is a mountain in Hungary. Before 2014 it was considered to be the highest point of the area, but according to recent surveys Szilvási-kő is  meters tall.

It is easily accessible from Szilvásvárad on a few hundred meters long tourist path, which leads to a cave in the mountain.

Istállós-kő cave
The cave was first explored by Pál Roskó in 1911. It is a rich archaeological site with 30,000-40,000 year old finds including cave bear and Bison latifrons bones and tusks, stone and bone tools and a Paleolithic hearth now displayed in the Hungarian National Museum.

The site was later excavated by Ottokár Kadić in 1929 and Mária Mottl in 1938; its planned and detailed excavation started in 1947 and was led by László Vértes. Based on fill stratification and animal remains used as period indicators, the archaeologists explored the cave's history, and determined the age of the three cultural layers and the characteristics of the human population(s) that lived there. The cave gained protected status in 1944 and specially protected status in 1982.

The newest excavations started in 2000 and were led by Árpád Ringer. The importance of the cave lies in the findings of 66 different Ice Age species, which makes its fauna the richest among Aurignacian faunas in Europe; three new mammal species and twenty new bird species were described based on its microfauna.

References

 Vértes László: Az istállóskői barlang aurignaci II. kultúrájának kormeghatározása, 1959, Akadémiai Nyomda, Budapest 
 T. Dobosi Viola: Bone finds from Istállós-kő Cave, Praehistoria, 2002. 3. évf. 79–102. oldal
 Adams, Brian: New radiocarbon dates from Szeleta and Istállós-kő caves, Hungary, Praehistoria, 2002. 3. évf. 53–55. oldal
 Ringer Árpád: The new image of Szeleta and Istállós-kő caves in the Bükk Mountains: a revision project between 1999-2002, Praehistoria, 2002. 3. évf. 47–52. oldal

External links
 Az Istállós-kő és környezetének térképe
 Istállóskői ősemberbarlang Szilvásvárad

Mountains of Hungary
Tourist attractions in Hungary
Mountains of the Western Carpathians
Geography of Heves County
Tourist attractions in Heves County